Soehrensia candicans is a species of cactus from northern and western Argentina (Monte Desert). It has large fragrant white flowers that open at night.

Description

The fragrant white flowers open at night.

Taxonomy
The species was first described in print by Joseph zu Salm-Reifferscheidt-Dyck in 1834 in his work Hortus Dyckensis, where he attributed the name Cereus candicans to Gillies. In 1920, Britton and Rose placed the species in Trichocereus. In a 1987 publication, David Hunt transferred the species to the genus Echinopsis, attributing this placement to Frédéric Weber. The broad circumscription of Echinopsis remains controversial; the genus is accepted not to be monophyletic.

Pharmacology
Soehrensia candicans contains 0.5–5.0% Hordenine

References

External links

Cacti of South America
Flora of Argentina
candicans
Plants described in 1834